Honeymoon is a 2014 American supernatural horror film directed by Leigh Janiak, who co-wrote the screenplay with Phil Graziadei. Janiak's feature film directorial debut, it stars Rose Leslie and Harry Treadaway as a newly married couple whose honeymoon ends up being ruined by a series of strange events. The film had its world premiere on March 7, 2014, at South by Southwest, and was theatrically released by Magnolia Pictures on September 12, 2014.

Plot
Bea and Paul are newly married and are spending their honeymoon at a rustic cabin, which belongs to her family, in a secluded Canadian forest. They visit a small restaurant where they meet Will, the owner and Bea's childhood friend. Will's wife Annie interrupts, saying they need to get away. That night, Paul wakes up to find Bea missing. He finds her naked and disoriented in the woods and takes her back to the cabin, where she claims she was sleepwalking due to stress. However, Paul is suspicious since Bea doesn't have a history of sleepwalking.

Over subsequent days, Bea seemingly forgets how to do several basic tasks, but insists that she is fine. Paul observes her practicing future conversations in the bathroom mirror, and she struggles to remember common words. One night, Paul is disturbed by bright lights shining through their bedroom window, but is unable to find its source. He returns to where he found Bea the night she vanished, discovering a gown she claimed to have packed. The gown is covered in a mysterious goo. Despite her repeated denial, Paul concludes that Will is responsible and goes to confront him.

Paul sees Annie outside the restaurant. She exhibits similar behavior to Bea and bears identical marks on her thighs. Annie claims that Will is hiding and again warns Paul to stay away before departing. Paul finds Will's bloody baseball hat floating in the water. He enters their home and finds several pages of notes describing basic details about Annie, including her and Will's names, along with security camera footage of Annie following the bright lights into the woods.

Paul discovers that Bea has taken similar notes, and accuses her of being someone else. She locks herself in the bathroom, and when Paul breaks in he finds her repeatedly stabbing herself in the genitals with a toilet bowl cleaner. Paul ties her to the bed, and interrogates her about details of their relationship, most of which she either misremembers or has forgotten. She puts Paul's hand into her vagina and has him remove a large worm-like creature.

Bea explains that the night she disappeared into the woods, she saw the same lights Paul had seen and walked to them. She encountered a group of silhouetted figures who impregnated her with the creature. Bea claims that she is herself, but that the figures are taking away what is left of her. Paul scrambles to find their car keys, but she insists that they cannot leave. After a beam of light suddenly appears, she knocks Paul out and takes him into the middle of the lake on a boat, fastening an anchor to his legs. He awakens, with Bea explaining that she is protecting him from the figures by "hiding" him under the water. Paul tries to escape, but she throws him overboard.

Bea is shown to be deteriorating with her skin peeling off and her eyes discolored. After watching her and Paul's wedding video, she is met by a similarly-deteriorated Annie, and they walk into the lights together.

Cast
Rose Leslie as Bea
Harry Treadaway as Paul
Ben Huber as Will
Hanna Brown as Annie

Production
The development of Honeymoon began in 2010, after Janiak viewed Monsters and Tiny Furniture, and she and Phil Graziadei began writing the script in 2012. While writing the film's script, Janiak was inspired by the idea that "Even small moments ... can drive a wedge between people" and, with her writing partner, wondered "how far [they] could push them until they started falling apart." Janiak chose Rose Leslie to play the role of Bea after seeing her performance as Ygritte on Game of Thrones. Principal photography began in spring 2013 and had a limited budget.

Reception
On Rotten Tomatoes, the film holds a rating of 76% based on 58 reviews, with an average rating of 5.80/10. The site's consensus reads, "Smart, stylish, and nail-bitingly tense, Honeymoon packs more slow-building horror than many bigger-budget productions." On Metacritic, the film has an aggregated score of 65 out of 100 based on 10 critic reviews, indicating "generally favorable reviews".

Ryan Turek of Shock Till You Drop gave Honeymoon a positive review, stating "Janiak demonstrates some wonderfully confident direction for a first-timer, utilizing space, sound design and two very good lead actors as her tools to slowly amplify the tension and mess with your head." Ryland Aldrich of Twitch Film also praised the film and called it "a good story, excellently told, and very, very scary."

Andy Greene of Pop Insomniacs gave it a mixed review, saying that the film "isn’t going to blow your mind, or scare the crap out of you", but added that director Leigh Janiak "is clever enough to bank on these young stars and their explosive chemistry instead." Mike McCahill of The Guardian gave the film a score of 2 stars out of 5, writing: "Co-writer/director Leigh Janiak aims for Lars von Trier’s sustained dread, but manages only vague unease."

References

External links
 
 

2014 films
2014 horror films
2010s mystery horror films
2010s science fiction horror films
Alien abduction films
American mystery horror films
American science fiction horror films
2014 directorial debut films
2010s English-language films
Films about marriage
Films about honeymoon
Films directed by Leigh Janiak
2010s American films